Raj Kumar Yadvendrasinhji (born c. December 1916, date of death unknown), a member of the Jamnagar royal family, played first-class cricket in India from 1935 to 1947.

Yadvendrasinhji made his first-class debut in 1934-35, and played in the Nawanagar team that won the Ranji Trophy final in 1936-37, along with his cousins Indravijaysinhji and Ranvirsinhji. Batting at number nine, he made 39 not out and 45 not out, sharing a ninth-wicket partnership of 76 in the first innings with Ranvirsinhji, and a tenth-wicket partnership of 133 in 96 minutes in the second innings with Mubarak Ali.

He continued to play for Nawanagar with moderate success until 1947-48. He twice made his highest score of 58. In 1945-46, against Baroda, he made 58 and 27 and took a wicket in each innings. In his next match, in 1946-47, he top-scored with 58 in the second innings when Nawanagar lost by an innings to Bombay.

Family tree

References

External links
Yadvendrasinhji at CricketArchive
Vadencourt British Cemetery

1910s births
Year of death missing
Indian cricketers
Nawanagar cricketers
Cricketers from Gujarat